The Masters of Evil is a supervillain team appearing in American comic books published by Marvel Comics. The first version of the team appeared in The Avengers #6 (July 1964), with the lineup continually changing over the years.

Publication history
The first version of the Masters of Evil debuted in The Avengers #6 and were created by Stan Lee and Jack Kirby.

The second version of the Masters of Evil debuted in The Avengers #54 and were created by Roy Thomas, John Buscema, and George Tuska.

The third version of the Masters of Evil debuted in The Avengers #222 and were created by Jim Shooter, Steven Grant, and Greg LaRocque.

The fourth version of the Masters of Evil debuted in The Avengers #270 and were created by Roger Stern, John Buscema, and Tom Palmer.

The fifth version of the Masters of Evil debuted in Guardians of the Galaxy #28 and were created by Jim Valentino, Herb Trimpe, and Steve Montano.

The sixth version of the Masters of Evil debuted in The Incredible Hulk #449, written by Peter David and drawn by Mike Deodato, although they were actually created by Kurt Busiek and Mark Bagley.

The seventh version of the Masters of Evil debuted in Thunderbolts #3 and were created by Kurt Busiek, Mark Bagley, and Vince Russell.

The eighth version of the Masters of Evil debuted in Secret Avengers #21.1 and were created by Rick Remender, Patrick Zircher and Andy Troy.

The ninth version of the Masters of Evil debuted in Thunderbolts #10 and were created by Jim Zub, Jon Malin, Kurt Busiek and Mark Bagley.

Fictional team biography

Baron Heinrich Zemo's Masters of Evil
The original Masters of Evil (consisting of existing Marvel Comics supervillains the Black Knight, the Melter, and the Radioactive Man) was gathered by former Nazi scientist Baron Heinrich Zemo. Despite attempting to capture the Avengers with Adhesive X and spreading it over the city, the Avengers find an antidote with the help of Paste-Pot Pete, give it to the Masters in secret (causing them to accidentally free people), and then send most of the members to jail. Zemo is tricked into opening a container filled with tear gas inside his helicopter, but escapes anyway.

Baron Zemo leads the team in his revenge on Captain America and the Avengers. The team had been joined by the Enchantress and the Executioner, whom Zemo found in their exile to Earth that was imposed on them by Odin for attacking Thor. The Enchantress hypnotizes Thor into attacking the Avengers, but Iron Man breaks him out of the trance. Meanwhile, Captain America has been lured to South America to fight Zemo. After defeating Zemo, Captain America returns on Zemo's helicopter and stops Zemo from shooting the Avengers. However, the Enchantress casts a spell which gets the helicopter to the rooftop she and the Executioner are on. The Executioner knocks Captain America out by striking his shoulder, and takes him out of the helicopter, after which they all try to escape. The Masters are sent to another dimension in a space warp generated by Thor.

Two issues later, the Enchantress returns them to Earth using a spell. Simon Williams is given superhuman strength with an ionic ray, though he is told he will die in a week unless given an antidote Zemo has. He captures the Wasp and lures the Avengers into a trap, but sacrifices himself to save the Avengers. Immortus appears and offers to help the Masters by defeating the Avengers. He succeeds in sending Captain America to the Tower of London in 1760. The Masters attack the Avengers, but Captain America manages to return. The Enchantress, sensing defeat, sends the villains back in time to before they met Immortus.

In a later issue, Zemo kidnaps Rick Jones with an attractor beam and has the Enchantress and the Executioner release the Black Knight and the Melter (the Radioactive Man having been deported back to China). They attack the other Avengers, forcing Captain America to go alone to Zemo's kingdom to rescue Rick. The Executioner tells the Avengers that a battle in the city would hurt many people, meaning they should surrender. Captain America blinds Zemo with his shield and Zemo dies when he accidentally triggers a rock slide. The Black Knight and the Melter are then captured after Thor transports them to another dimension with different scientific laws, meaning their weapons rebound. The Enchantress and the Executioner escape by running away before the transportation happened.

Ultron's Masters of Evil

The second version, organized by the robot Ultron (under the alias the Crimson Cowl), consisted of the second Black Knight (who joined the team with the intention of betraying them), Klaw, the Melter, the Radioactive Man and Whirlwind. This incarnation made one more appearance. Ultron used this incarnation to blackmail New York.

Egghead's Masters of Evil
Criminal scientist Egghead organized a third version, consisting of Moonstone, the original Scorpion, Tiger Shark and longtime member Whirlwind. After the team's defeat, Egghead kept only Moonstone and Tiger Shark; the Scorpion and Whirlwind were replaced with the original Beetle, the Shocker, and veteran member the Radioactive Man. Egghead uses this incarnation to assist him in making technological breakthroughs.

Baron Helmut Zemo's Masters of Evil

First version
A fourth version was formed by Baron Helmut Zemo. This team uses over a dozen villains, consisting of the Absorbing Man, Blackout, Black Mamba, the Fixer, Goliath, the Grey Gargoyle, Mister Hyde, Moonstone, the Screaming Mimi, Tiger Shark, Titania, Whirlwind, the Wrecking Crew (Bulldozer, Piledriver, Thunderball and the Wrecker), and Yellowjacket, created with the goal of overwhelming the Avengers with sheer raw power, whereas others had attempted to match the current line-up.

The villains storm Avengers Mansion in a multi-issue storyline titled "Avengers Under Siege".

A flashback later revealed that Augustus Roman's family had died during the fight between the Avengers and the Masters of Evil.

Second version

The sixth incarnation was again assembled by Baron Helmut Zemo, and posed as superheroes known as the Thunderbolts. In addition to Zemo, the team consisted of the Beetle, the Fixer, Goliath, Moonstone, and the Screaming Mimi. All eventually became heroes and renounced their criminal ways, though Zemo, the Fixer, and Moonstone all returned to villainy some time later.

Third version
Baron Helmut Zemo created an 11th incarnation consisting of Whiplash, the Man-Killer, Klaw, Tiger Shark, and the Wrecking Crew, all of whom had been members of previous incarnations of the Masters of Evil. Baron Zemo sent them out to persuade Atlas of the Thunderbolts, the former Goliath of Zemo's earlier incarnation of the Masters of Evil, to rejoin the team. Atlas resisted and only an unexpected reappearance of the Thunderbolt Jolt interrupted the Masters' plan. The Masters then went after the Winter Soldier, who was then leading the Thunderbolts, and captured him. Zemo and the Masters then assaulted the Thunderbolts in their base, capturing several of them.

During the "Opening Salvo" part of the Secret Empire storyline, Baron Zemo has Kobik send Bucky back through time to World War II and another battle with the Thunderbolts, in which the Man-Killer was apparently killed by Kobik. Upon Atlas, the Fixer, and Moonstone joining the Masters of Evil, they worked to reassemble Kobik. As Erik Selvig hordes the fragments that he has, kisses them, and commits suicide, the Kobik-reprogrammed Captain America persuaded Baron Zemo to have the Masters of Evil join HYDRA's "Army of Evil." Baron Zemo did just that. The Masters of Evil assisted the Army of Evil in causing havoc in protest for what happened at Pleasant Hill.

Doctor Octopus' Masters of Evil
The fifth incarnation was organized by Doctor Octopus, but bore little resemblance to previous incarnations. Its roster included Gargantua, Jackhammer, Oddball, Powderkeg, and Puff Adder, in addition to former members the Absorbing Man, the Shocker, Titania, and Yellowjacket.

This incarnation initially fought the original Guardians of the Galaxy - a superhero group from an alternate future timeline - but then fought with the Guardians against an army of doppelgangers.

The Crimson Cowl's Masters of Evil

First version
The seventh incarnation was recruited by the Crimson Cowl (Justine Hammer). This version consisted first of the third Cyclone, the Flying Tiger, Klaw, the Man-Killer and Tiger Shark and later expanded to include the Aqueduct, the Bison, Blackwing, Boomerang, the Cardinal, the Constrictor, Dragonfly, the second Eel, the Icemaster, Joystick, Lodestone, the Man-Ape, Quicksand, Scorcher, Shatterfist, Shockwave, Slyde, Sunstroke, and Supercharger.

Second version
The eighth incarnation, led by the Crimson Cowl, consisted of Black Mamba, the Cardinal, the Cyclone, the Gypsy Moth, Hydro-Man, the Machinesmith, and the Man-Killer.

Both versions of the Crimson Cowl's Masters of Evil sought to master and control Earth's superhuman mercenaries. They even tried to get the Thunderbolts to join them.

The Shadow Council's Masters of Evil
Max Fury of the Shadow Council forms a ninth incarnation of the Masters of Evil, consisting of Princess Python, Vengeance, and Whiplash. They were discovered by the Secret Avengers during a mission run by Captain America and Hawkeye. Max Fury later recruits the Black Talon, the Brothers Grimm, Carrion, the Constrictor, Crossfire, Diablo, Firebrand, the Griffin, Killer Shrike, Lady Stilt-Man, the Pink Pearl, and the Squid to join the Shadow Council's Masters of Evil. Fury and the Masters of Evil capture John Steele after he attempts to escape Bagalia (a country that the Shadow Council established) with the Serpent Crown and the Crown of Thorns. In order for the Masters of Evil to obtain the Crown of Wolves for the Shadow Council, Fury hired the Taskmaster to retrieve it. The Taskmaster demanded more money for the job and he hid in the Hole (a bar located in an underground city in Bagalia). Upon claiming the Crown of Wolves, Fury was unable to harness its power because he is a Life Model Decoy. When the Taskmaster donned the Crown of Wolves, he was unable to control the powers of the Abyss. Under the control of the Abyss, the Masters of Evil and the other people in Bagalia make their move. The Secret Avengers fight to keep the people under control of the Abyss from leaving Bagalia and invading other countries to spread the possession to other people. While possessed by the Abyss, the Taskmaster used its power to take control of the villains and have them board an airplane out of Bagalia to spread the campaign of the Abyss. While the others fight the possessed villains and other people, Venom uses his symbiote to break the Crowns and capture the Taskmaster.

When the second incarnation of the Secret Avengers raid Bagalia to free the Taskmaster, they have to fight through the Masters of Evil. During this time, it is shown that a duplicate of the Bi-Beast, Madcap, the Ringer and a number of other supervillains have joined the Masters of Evil.

The Masters of Evil are featured in "Avengers Undercover" as part of the second wave of comics that are part of the "Marvel NOW!" branding. Following the death of Max Fury, Baron Helmut Zemo had been sworn in as the new leader of the Masters of Evil. He is shown to have Madame Masque as his right-hand woman, has the Constrictor as his bodyguard, and Daimon Hellstrom is in their company as their magic expert. The Anachronism, Cammi, Chase Stein, Death Locket, Hazmat, and Nico Minoru teleport to Bagalia in disguise and locate Cullen Bloodstone at the Hole (a Bagalian bar owned by Arcade). After a fight with the villains there, Cullen reveals that he has become a member of the Masters of Evil, having been accepted by them. The Constrictor and Madam Masque arrange for Cullen to teleport the group to a nearby swanky party at Massacrer Casino hosted by Arcade so that they can get revenge on him once and for all. Baron Zemo, Madame Masque, the Constrictor and Daimon Hellstrom watch as the young heroes try to avoid being killed, as Arcade has arranged the party at Massacrer Casino as the testing grounds for his newest version of "Murderworld": fancy parties at casinos where the rich and powerful can try and kill each other to prove their supremacy. After Arcade was killed, Baron Zemo, Madame Masque, the Constructor, and Daimon Hellstrom begin plotting their next move regarding the heroes. After the young heroes are apprehended during a S.H.I.E.L.D. raid on Bagalia, Daimon Hellstrom later teleports the S.H.I.E.L.D. lair back to Bagalia, where Baron Zemo offers the group a chance to join the Masters of Evil. Baron Zemo instructs the Constrictor, Daimon Hellstrom, and Madame Masque to take a portion of the Murderworld survivors and take them into Bagalia City. While the other young heroes take up Baron Zemo's offer to join the Masters of Evil (with a plan to take the group down from within), Cammi is the only one to decline. Baron Zemo hears that she is the only one not joining and says that they will respect her choice. Cammi flies away, only to be caught by the Constrictor and brutally slammed into a rock wall. Bleeding and semi-conscious from the surprise attack, Cammi lays under the Constrictor as he says "The man gave you a choice. You picked wrong."

Lightmaster's Masters of Evil
While the Shadow Council had their version, Lightmaster assembles a more traditional lineup (10th incarnation) when he and his henchmen, the Wrecking Crew, run afoul of the Superior Spider-Man and his Superior Six while attacking Alchemax and attempting to steal its technology during a plot to blackmail New York City for money. Besides the Wrecking Crew, this roster includes the Absorbing Man, Titania, Mister Hyde, Whirlwind and the original Blackout.

West Coast version
To combat the West Coast Avengers, Madame Masque formed a West Coast version of the Masters of Evil consisting of the Eel, Graviton, Lady Bullseye, MODOK Superior, Satana, and Kate Bishop's parents Derek and Eleanor Bishop.

Multiversal Masters of Evil

When the Prehistoric Avengers fought a younger Thanos and sent him back to the future, Mephisto found out that an alternate version of Doctor Doom called Doom Supreme had witnessed this fight. Mephisto suggested to Doom Supreme to form a team of evil villains that would take on the Avengers. As a condition from the Council of Red, Doom Supreme is to save Earth-616 for last. He formed a Multiverse version of the Masters of Evil that consisted of Black Skull, an alternate version of Dark Phoenix and her Berserkers (made of an alternate version of Wolverine called Hound and an alternate version of Thor), Ghost Goblin, Kid Thanos, and King Killmonger. They traveled to the different parts of the Multiverse slaying their versions of the Prehistoric Avengers and rewriting the future to fit their ways. Their activities were opposed by the Deathloks that work for Avenger Prime. Though they violated a condition that the Council of Red gave them. When they arrived, they were watched by Orb who viewed them through the eye of Uatu the Watcher that he still had. Doom Supreme killed Orb and destroyed the eye. King Killmonger, Dark Phoenix, and the Berserkers then attacked Asgard which brought them into conflict with Echo's Phoenix form, Iron Man, Thor, and the Deathloks. The Deathloks find Captain America, Captain Marvel, and Star Brand as they are attacked by Black Skull and Ghost Goblin. As Captain America and Captain Marvel are overwhelmed, Star Brand shows up to attack them. As they retreat, Black Skull has Ghost Goblin dump his Noggin Bombs which are annulled when Star Brand matures and negates their explosions. Doom Supreme and Kid Thanos attack Avengers Mountain. They engage Black Panther, Namor, Valkyrie, and the Deathlok with them. As Doom Supreme regresses Valkyrie back to Jane Foster before he was headbutted by her horse, Namor struggles against Kid Thanos. Black Panther wields his Vibranium Dambe Boxer Cords and other defenses against magic while calling himself Red Panther. As the Deathlok reaches the brain of Avengers Mountain to put out a distress signal on what happened on Earth-616, Black Panther, Valkyrie, and Namor continue their fight against Doom Supreme and Kid Thanos until they retreat. The Deathlok detects that Avengers Mountain is about to self-destruct as Black Panther, Namor, and Valkyrie work to get out before the explosion. As Captain America, Captain Marvel, Star Brand, and the Deathlok with them are trying to reach Avengers Mountain, the Quinjet is struck by the Mjolnir of Berserker Thor killing the Deathlok in the process. Thor is locked in combat with Berserker Thor as Dark Phoenix watches as Berserker Thor refers to her as his mother. Echo's Phoenix form shows up to knock back Berserker Thor. Dark Phoenix then restrains Echo as Thor slays his Berserker counterpart. As Dark Phoenix gets away, Thor has Echo ask the Phoenix Force what he is. Echo states that he already knows. They then join Iron Man, Captain America, Captain Marvel, and Star Brand into heading to Avengers Mountain. Far from Avengers Mountain, Doom Supreme and Kid Thanos meet up with Iron Inquisitor and Mephisto in the form of a dog as he nears the corpse of Orb. Under Mephisto's orders, Doom Supreme unburn Uatu's eye fragment and puts it in his own eye. As Doom Supreme and Kid Thanos enter a portal to meet with their teammates and get back to work, Mephisto and Iron Inquisitor talk about what to do with the Multiversal Masters of Evil as Mephisto's dog form eats at the fragments of Uatu's eye. Then he has Orb's corpse dumped into the ocean.

It was also revealed that the Multiversal Masters of Evil had conquered some of the worlds like how Black Skull had ruled over Earth-818 with the War Machines that he had that world's Tony Stark build. By the time Robbie Reyes and the Deathlok with him arrived, they met Earth-818's Tony Stark who operated as Ant-Man and saved him from the War Machines. Robbie and his Deathlok companion are later rescued from Black Skull by Ant-Man and his resistance consisting of Vision, Moon Knight (Mariama Spector), Wonder Man, and Infinity Thing. With help from the granddaughters of King Thor, Robbie, his Deathlok companion, and the Resistance defeated Black Skull and his alternate counterparts while liberating Earth-818. Ant-Man joins Robbie and his Deathlok companion in their quest to liberate the enslaved Earths from the Multiversal Masters of Evil.

In a flashback, the Multiversal Masters of Evil invaded Earth-91 and slew that version of the Prehistoric Avengers who are all Man-Things. Doom Supreme orders his Multiversal Masters of Evil to keep him out of their squabbles as King Killmonger claims that Doom Supreme has not even claimed his Earth yet. Doom Supreme claims that he claimed what he required from Earth-91 and to "pick the bones however they like".

When the Multiversal Masters of Evil conquer another Earth and plan to return to Earth-616, Ghost Rider arrives where he controls Black Skull's symbiote enough to subdue King Killmonger and uses his Hell Charger to knock down Kid Thanos and Hound before it drags Dark Phoenix. Then he subdues Ghost Goblin before engaging Doom Supreme. After Deathlok and Ant-Man of Earth-818 arrive where the latter shrinks Doom Supreme, Dark Phoenix goes on the attack as Deathlok orders Ant-Man of Earth-818 to get Ghost Rider away while he buys them some time. Following Deathlok's death, Doom Supreme tells the Multiversal Masters of Evil that they need to regroup as he knows where they are going. Ghost Goblin asks Doom Supreme if he will restore himself to normal size as well. Doom Supreme then states that they will visit that location before heading to Earth-616 as he vows that "No Avenger gets out alive".

At the time when the Avengers travel to prehistoric times and encounter the Avengers of that time, Agamotto breaks up the fight between them as Doom Supreme arrives where he removes Agamotto's eyes and kills the Prehistoric Star Brand. Then the rest of the Multiversal Masters of Evil arrive. As the Avengers go on the attack, Dark Phoenix takes them down much to the dismay of Kid Thanos and Ghost Goblin. When Hound goes on the attack, he is killed by the Prehistoric Ghost Rider. As the local ancestral ape-men hide in the caves, Odin and Valkyrie fight Doom Supreme, Echo and the Prehistoric Iron Fist fight Black Skull, Iron Man, Captain Marvel, and Namor fight Dark Phoenix, Captain America and Prehistoric Moon Knight fight Kid Thanos, Thor and Agamotto fight King Killmonger, and Nighthawk and Prehistoric Ghost Rider fight Ghost Goblin while Star Brand goes to the body of her prehistoric counterpart where the Prehistoric Ghost Rider depowers Ghost Goblin and kills him. When Dark Phoenix notes that this Earth is taking longer to conquer, Doom Supreme starts to cast a spell to wipe out the ancestral ape-men as Prehistoric Ghost Rider ends up one of the victims. As the fight rages on, Lady Phoenix arrives. As he narrates about his internal clock stating that the Avengers' fight with the Multiversal Masters of Evil has gone on for 9 days, Iron Man fights King Killmonger who is then killed by Prehistoric Iron Fist. Nightwing and Prehistoric Moon Knight fight Black Skull as Captain America uses his shield that came in contact with fire to defeat Black Skull as the Venom symbiote makes it's way to Kid Thanos. Echo and Valkyrie face off against Dark Phoenix where Valkyrie slices off Dark Phoenix's arm. Echo receives aid from across time as Soldier Supreme of 1943, Kid Starbrand and Reno Phoenix of 1868, Ghost Ronin of 1655, and the Tyrannosaurus Starbrand of 66,000,000 BC donate the powers to Echo as she subdues Kid Thanos and the Venom symbiote. When Iron Man claims that Dark Phoenix hasn't gotten far, they are unaware that it's really Dark Phoenix in disguise as she is revealed to be a variant of Mystique from Earth-14412. She goes to find Doom Supreme and finds only a hologram when she accuses him of letting their teammates fall in battle. The real Doom Supreme is assembling his army of Doctor Doom variants that are loyal to him and are on Doom the Living Planet.

Membership

Related teams

Young Masters

During the "Dark Reign" storyline, a young version of the team - controlled by criminal mastermind Norman Osborn - debuts in the miniseries Dark Reign: Young Avengers.

Bastards of Evil

A group calling themselves the Bastards of Evil debuted in the 2010 "Heroic Age" storyline. All members claim to be the children of supervillains who were discarded and disavowed by their parents. They include Aftershock (the supposed daughter of Electro), Warhead (the supposed son of the Radioactive Man), Mortar (the supposed daughter of the Grey Gargoyle), Singularity (the supposed son of Graviton), and Ember (the supposed son of Pyro).

It was later revealed that the Bastards are led by a child genius known as Superior (who claims to be the son of the Leader). It was also revealed that the Bastards were actually normal teenagers who were mutated by exposure to radiation by Superior as well as given false memory implants. The surviving Bastards are held in the Raft after their capture.

Reception
 In 2021, CBR.com ranked the Masters of Evil 8th in their "Marvel: 10 Characters Baron Zemo Created In The Comics" list.
 In 2022, Screen Rant included the Masters of Evil in their "15 Most Powerful Black Panther Villains" list.
 In 2022, Screen Rant included The Masters of Evil in their "10 Most Powerful Hercules Villains In Marvel Comics" list.

Other versions

Heroes Reborn (1996)
In an alternate reality depicted in the 1996 Heroes Reborn miniseries, the Masters of Evil consist of the Black Knight, Klaw, the Melter, the Radioactive Man, and Whirlwind After Klaw leaves the team, the Crimson Dynamo and the Titanium Man join the Masters of Evil. The Black Knight tries to gain an "audience" with Doctor Doom only for him, Crimson Dynamo, and Titanium Man to be killed by Doom's Doombots. Following this, Whirlwind retires to start a new life.

"Heroes Reborn" (2021)
In an alternate reality depicted in the 2021 "Heroes Reborn" miniseries, the Masters of Doom exist as enemies of the Squadron Supreme of America and consist of Doctor Juggernaut, the Silver Witch, the All-Gog, and the Black Skull. They escape from the Negative Zone and launch an attack on Washington D.C., only to be repelled by the Squadron.

Marvel Adventures
The Masters of Evil appear in Marvel Adventures, consisting of Baron Helmut Zemo, the Abomination, the Leader, and Ultron.

Later in the series, a group called the New Masters of Evil appear. This group consists of Egghead, the Man-Bull, the Melter, and Whirlwind.

Ultimate Marvel
In the Ultimate Marvel universe, there are two groups equivalent to the Masters of Evil that threaten the Ultimates:

The Liberators were introduced in Ultimates 2, formed by Loki (under the alias of Norwegian scientist "Gunnar Golman") and featured superpowered villains that invaded the United States of America as recruits, such as the Chang Lam / Abomination, the Crimson Dynamo, the Schizoid Man, the Colonel, Hurricane, Swarm, the Red Wasp, and Perun. They received support from international governments, such as China, France, Iran, North Korea, Syria, and later Russia, and other superpowered individuals such as Natasha Romanoff / Black Widow, Hank Pym, and his Ultron / Vision II sentries. However, they are all defeated by America's heroes, with Perun surrendering to S.H.I.E.L.D. and being held in the Triskelion and Loki being held by Odin for inciting a world war.

The Dark Ultimates were introduced in Ultimate Comics: Ultimates, as a group of superhumans gathered by a mysterious woman named Kang in order to retrieve the Infinity Gems, apparently to use it in order to prevent the destruction of the universe. They consisted of the Hulk, the Maker, Quicksilver, and a brainwashed Human Torch. After freeing the Ultimates from the Negative Zone, an influx of energy sent Kang back to her own time, abandoning the Maker to be imprisoned while the Gems were shattered.

In other media

Television
 Baron Heinrich Zemo's Masters of Evil appear in The Marvel Super Heroes episode "Zemo and his Masters of Evil", consisting of Heinrich, the Black Knight, the Radioactive Man, and the Melter.
 Baron Helmut Zemo's Masters of Evil appear in The Avengers: United They Stand episode "Command Decision", consisting of Helmut, the Absorbing Man, Boomerang, the Cardinal, Dragonfly, Moonstone, Tiger Shark, and Whirlwind.
 Baron Heinrich Zemo's Masters of Evil appear in The Avengers: Earth's Mightiest Heroes. This version of the group is brought together by the Enchantress, the Executioner, and Heinrich, who recruit Arnim Zola, Wonder Man, Crimson Dynamo, the Abomination, Chemistro, the Grey Gargoyle, and the Living Laser throughout the series. They battle the Avengers twice until Heinrich discovers the Enchantress was secretly working with Loki to help him take over Asgard while Thor is away on Earth and betrays her while enacting a plot to use Karnilla's Norn Stones to fuse Earth with Asgard. After the Avengers foil the plot, the Enchantress seeks vengeance on Heinrich and eliminates Chemistro, Living Laser, and Zola, forcing the surviving Masters of Evil to ask for the Avengers' help in stopping her. During the Enchantress' subsequent attack, Black Panther builds a power dampener, which successfully negates her powers. Wonder Man prevents Heinrich from finishing her off, but when the Enchantress tries to take the last Norn Stone, Wonder Man grabs it simultaneously, causing both of them to disappear. In the aftermath, Heinrich, the Abomination, Crimson Dynamo, and the Executioner are incarcerated at Prison 42.
 The Masters of Evil appear in Marvel Disk Wars: The Avengers, consisting of MODOK, the Abomination, Baron Heinrich Zemo, Graviton, and Tiger Shark.
 Baron Helmut Zemo's Masters of Evil appear in the Avengers Assemble: Ultron Revolution, consisting of Helmut, the Beetle, the Fixer, Goliath, Moonstone, and Screaming Mimi. Following failed attacks on Stark Industries and Avengers Tower, the Masters of Evil reappear as the superhero team, the Thunderbolts via a shrouding device to mask their appearances. However, Screaming Mimi has a change of heart and convinces her teammates to join the Avengers in publicly exposing Helmut, who escapes while the remaining Masters of Evil turn themselves in.
 The Masters of Evil appear in Marvel Future Avengers, led by Kang the Conqueror and consisting of the Leader, the Enchantress, Ares, the Winter Soldier, Loki, and Bruno, a teenage HYDRA operative who underwent genetic manipulation as part of the "Emerald Rain" project, which Kang established to reverse-engineer Terrigen crystals and use them to mutate Earth's populace to become his new foot soldiers.

Video games
 The Masters of Evil appear in Marvel: Ultimate Alliance, led by Doctor Doom and consisting of Baron Mordo, Loki, the Enchantress, and Ultron as his lieutenants as well as Arcade, Attuma, Bullseye, Byrrah, Crimson Dynamo, the Executioner, Fin Fang Foom, the Lizard, MODOK, Mysterio, the Radioactive Man, the Rhino, the Scorpion, the Shocker, Tiger Shark, Warlord Krang, the Winter Soldier, and the Wrecking Crew. Additionally, the Mandarin, the Grey Gargoyle, and Dragon Man were members as well before they left when the Mandarin failed to take leadership from Doctor Doom.
 Baron Helmut Zemo's Masters of Evil appear in a self-titled DLC pack for Lego Marvel's Avengers, consisting of Helmut, the Enchantress, the Black Knight, Skurge, the Melter, the Radioactive Man, and Whirlwind.

References

External links
 Masters of Evil at Marvel.com
 
 
 
 
 
 
 Masters of Evil at Comic Vine

Comics characters introduced in 1964
Marvel Comics supervillain teams
Villains in animated television series